United Nations Security Council Resolution 28, adopted on August 6, 1947, appointed a sub-committee composed of all the representatives who proposed solutions for the Greek question to attempt to combine all of them into a new draft resolution.

The resolution passed with 10 votes; the Soviet Union abstained.

See also
List of United Nations Security Council Resolutions 1 to 100 (1946–1953)

References
Text of the Resolution at undocs.org

External links
 

 0028
 0028
 0028
1947 in Greece
1947 in Bulgaria
August 1947 events